Benjamin Walker is a British firefighter, author, and occupational safety professional. Walker specialises in teaching Fire Service Instructors and Commanders worldwide in tactical firefighting and first-response command with co-Author and business partner Shan Raffel. Walker's teachings on using science and engineering to enhance tactical firefighting have been frequently used and also cited in academic papers on Fire Dynamics as being one a small amount of textbooks geared to operational firefighters on scientific and engineering subjects These books are recommended reading for all those undertaking the Institution of Fire Engineers examinations.

Firefighter and training 
Walker was born in Staffordshire, West Midlands, and graduated from Newcastle University in 2002 with a Bachelor of Arts in Political Science and Government with upper honours. He served in the then known as Tyne and Wear Metropolitan Fire Brigade as an operational Officer with command experience of combined firefighting and live rescue operations, epitomised by the command of a large fire and rescue of multiple persons at an incident in Gateshead in 2010.

He later worked as a Tactical Firefighting and Live Fire Instructor for the London Fire Brigade and Babcock International Training partnership. In 2014 and 2015 he travelled through South America as a guest Instructor for the International Fire and Rescue Association on missions 51 and 56.

Author, writer and commentator
Walker is a noted writer and commentator in the field of Fire and Rescue and Emergency Preparedness.  Walker's books include Fire Dynamics for Firefighters, 
Reading Fire and Fighting Fire. He has also appeared as a subject matter expert on a Russia Today news broadcast.

Walker presented at the annual Fire Department Instructors Conference from 2015 to 2018. He was a keynote speaker for FDIC 2017.

In 2018, Walker released a novella memoir called The Fireman.

Controversy and Grenfell warnings

Controversy arose when it transpired that contents of Walker's 2016 textbook Fire Dynamics for Firefighters contained details of external fire spread of high rise buildings and how to prepare and fight these. London Fire Brigade Commissioner’s Dany Cotton’s statement to the official inquiry that the Grenfell Tower fire in 2017 had no precedent and could not be prepared were in direct contrast to information contained within Fire Dynamics for Firefighters on external fire spread, which as mentioned and cited within this article, was already recommended reading for Fire Officers studying for Institution of Fire Engineers Examinations. By extension this should have been read by London Fire Brigade personnel studying for these examinations. These two contrasting viewpoints, in textbook form from Walker's 2016 textbook and Cotton's verbally expressed statements in 2018 were noted within the fire industry but this interesting conflict of published opinions and insights was not debated, or explored further by the Grenfell Inquiry which covers the 2017 tragedy

Walker had also previously gone on record in 2016 UK national broadsheet newspaper The Guardian warning of cuts to firefighter training and consequential effects  In an article in the April 2017 issue of Fire Risk Management, Walker wrote about concerns at the lack of knowledge of building and construction and its relation to frontline firefighting tactics with potential for disastrous and total building losses and severe losses of life. Topics such as cuts to firefighting training and reduction of building and construction methods identified by Walker in both the broadsheet and journal articles were extensively discussed in the firefighting component of the official inquiry into the Grenfell tragedy, with the recommendations made in sections 33.9, 33.10e, 34.5, 34.6 of the Grenfell Inquiry Executive Summary of the Phase One Report notably tallying with the information, warnings and predictions that Walker had made in 2016 & 2017 as above.

Walker is a Managing Director of Ignis Global Ltd, a UK based fire, safety and security consultancy.

Accolades 
In 2014, Walker received the Godiva Award for outstanding achievement in Institution of Fire Engineers examinations

Walker was shortlisted for Fire magazine's Excellence in Fire and Emergency Awards in 2017 for Training Provider of the Year, the only individual to be rather than any organisation, and with Shan Raffel and Michael Benga for "International Best Practise".

Books 
Compartment Firefighting Series by Ben Walker with Shan Raffel
 Fire Dynamics for Firefighters (Pavilion Media, 2016), 
 Reading Fire (Pavilion Media, 2017), 
 Fighting Fire (Pavilion Media, 2017) 

Other books
 The Fireman (Ignis Global, 2018),

References 

Year of birth missing (living people)
Living people
British writers
People from Staffordshire
Alumni of Newcastle University
London Fire Brigade personnel